Grete Wold (born 15 January 1968) is a Norwegian politician.

She was elected representative to the Storting from the constituency of Vestfold for the period 2021–2025, for the Socialist Left Party.

In the Storting, she is a member of the Standing Committee on Local Government and Public Administration from 2021 to 2025.

References

1968 births
Living people
Socialist Left Party (Norway) politicians
Vestfold politicians
Members of the Storting
Women members of the Storting